Kevin Dillon (born 1941 in Clonakilty, County Cork) is an Irish former sportsperson.

References

1941 births
Living people
Clonakilty Gaelic footballers
Cork inter-county Gaelic footballers